Nagayama Station is the name of multiple train stations in Japan.

 Nagayama Station (Aichi) - (長山駅) in Aichi Prefecture
 Nagayama Station (Hokkaidō) - (永山駅) in Hokkaidō Prefecture
 Keiō-Nagayama Station - (京王永山駅) in Tokyo
 Odakyū-Nagayama Station - (小田急永山駅) in Tokyo

See also
 Kita-Nagayama Station